K3 may refer to:

Transportation
 China Railway K3/4
 K-3 (Kansas highway), a state highway in Kansas
 London Bus route K3 
 Taquan Air, an Alaskan commuter airline (by IATA code)
 K-3 cart
 Kia Forte, sold as Kia K3 in South Korea
 LNER Class K3, a class of British steam locomotives
 GSWRI Class K3, a Great Southern and Western Railway (Ireland) steam locomotive

Military
Units
 Life Regiment Hussars, Swedish cavalry regiment
Weapons
 K-3 (rifle), an Armenian-made bullpup rifle
 Daewoo K3, a light machine gun
Ships
 Soviet submarine K-3 Leninsky Komsomol, the first Soviet nuclear submarine
 , a 1914 United States Navy K-class submarine
 , a 1916 British K-class submarine
 , a 1940 Royal Navy Flower-class corvette
Airfields
 Pohang Airport, by United States Air Force designator during the Korean War

Science, technology, computing and mathematics 
 The Kleene logic K3
 A version of the K (programming language)
 K3 surface, a compact complex surface in mathematics
 Menadione, vitamin K3
 K3, 1774 marine chronometer made by Larcum Kendall
 Pentax K-3, a digital SLR camera

Media and entertainment
 K3 (band), a Belgian/Dutch girl group
 K3 (television), a Catalan television channel
 K3: Prison of Hell, a 2009 pornographic horror film
K3, a world in Donkey Kong Country 3: Dixie Kong's Double Trouble!

Other uses
 K3 League, a South Korean football league
 Gasherbrum IV, a mountain in the Karakoram previously surveyed as K3. Sometimes erroneously recorded as Broad Peak.
 Kankakee, Illinois, an expression or abbreviation used to identify Kankakee, IL